Daniel Lewis (born July 12, 1944) is a choreographer and author, and Dean of Dance at the New World School of the Arts. Internationally recognized dancer, teacher, choreographer and author. Danny is often seen sporting suspenders with the classic Julliard hat.

Biography

Dancer
Lewis was born in Brooklyn, New York; he graduated from the Fiorello H. LaGuardia High School of Music & Art and Performing Arts.   Formally High School of Performing Arts in 1962 and Juilliard in 1967. For twelve years beginning in 1962, he danced with the José Limón Dance Company originating many roles. As Limón's assistant, Lewis completed the choreography of the Waldstein Sonata, which Limón had not finished before his death. In addition Lewis danced with the companies of Ruth Currier, Felix Fibich, Stuart Hodes, Sofie Maslow, David Wood, Norman Walker, Matthew Diamond, Charles Weidman, Anna Sokolow, American Dance Theater, The Juilliard Dance Ensemble, Contemporary Dance System, Daniel Lewis Dance, plus others.  He danced in the Yiddish Theatre from 1960 to 1964.  He danced in the CBS Productions of AND DAVID WEPT, choreography by José Limón, DREAMS, choreography Anna Sokolow, and many LAMP UNTO MY FEET, CAMERA THREE, and PBS, WNET (NYC) programs.

His son, Quinn Lewis, is a talented cook and makes fire pizza and chicharo

Academician
Lewis joined the dance faculty of the Juilliard School in 1967, and was Assistant to the Director of the Dance, Martha Hill, at the Juilliard School between 1984 and 1987. He was also an adjunct professor at New York University and a professor at Amherst College for six years while his company was in residence there.

In 1987, Lewis joined the New World School of the Arts of the Miami Dade College as founding Dean of the Dance Department. He created the dance division's eight-year Bachelor of Fine Arts (BFA) program which begins in the ninth grade. In 1988, he formed Miami Dance Futures, Inc., a production company for the Miami Balanchine Conference, the Dance History Scholars’ Conference, the National High School Dance Festival and the Daniel Lewis Dance Sampler.

Honorary Doctor of Fine Arts Degree from the University of Florida. December 14th 2012

Choreographer
From 1966 to 1988, Lewis choreographed 24 choreographic works for such schools and companies as, Towson State College, Swarthmore College, The José Limón Dance Company, Barnard College, Teachers' College, the University of Michigan, Hampshire College, The New World School of the Arts, The Juilliard School, The University of Calgary, Portland State, American Wind Symphony, Lincoln Center Student Programs, Reed College, UCLA, Tsoying Senior High School, Daniel Lewis Dance, Contemporary Dance System, New World School of the Arts, as well as companies in South America and England. He choreographed operas for the American Opera Center at Lincoln Center, The Houston Grand Opera, and the Dallas Civic Opera.Danny created the following dance works from 1966 to 1988:
• 1966: Man Made (Barnard College)
• 1967: The Minding of the Flesh Is Death (Lincoln Center Student Programs)
• 1970: The Bokinski Brothers (Barnard College)
• 1972: My Echo, My Shadow, and Me (NEA Choreographic Fellowship, Barnard College)
• 1972: Irving the Terrific (UCLA)
• 1974: And First They Slaughtered the Angels (Contemporary Dance System)
• 1974: No Strings (Barnard College)
• 1976: Cabbage Patch (American Wind Symphony)
• 1976: Proliferation (Juilliard School)
• 1978: Life and Other Things (Daniel Lewis Dance: A Repertory Company)
• 1979: Mostly Beethoven (Juilliard School)
• 1980: Beethoven Duet (Benefit Concert Honoring Doris Humphrey and Charles Weidman)
• 1980: There’s Nothing Here of Me but Me (Amherst College)
• 1981: Open Book (Daniel Lewis Dance: A Repertory Company)
• 1982: Moments (The Juilliard School)
• 1982: To Doris and Charles (Portland State)
• 1984: Textured Lighting (Daniel Lewis Dance: A Repertory Company)
• 1984: Atomic Ambience (University of Calgary)
• 1985: Women (Juilliard School)
• 1985: Mind over Matter (Bennington College Summer Dance Program)
• 1986: Bibleland (The University of Calgary)
• 1987: Air Raid (SUNY Purchase)
• 1988: The Morning after the Night Before (Towson State College)

Director and reconstructor
He has staged and directed the works of José Limón and Doris Humphrey for the Hong Kong academy of the Performing Arts, Miami City Ballet, The National Ballet School, The London School of Contemporary Dance, The American Dance Festival, Royal Danish Ballet Royal Swedish Ballet, American Ballet Theatre, Batsheva Dance Company, National Ballet of Canada, The Alvin Ailey American Dance Theatre.

Other achievements
He has staged works for such companies as the Royal Swedish Ballet, the Alvin Ailey American Dance Theatre, the American Ballet Theatre, the National Ballet of Canada, He has been commissioned to create works by many companies including the Dallas Civic Opera, the American Opera Center at Lincoln Center, the Juilliard School and the University of California.

Affiliations
He was President of the Board of Directors of the National Association of Schools of Dance, has served as a dance panelist on the Fulbright Screening Committee and for the National Endowment for the Arts, dance panelist and adviser to the Canada Council and the Florida Department of State’s Division of Cultural Affairs. Members of the Council of Arts Accrediting Associations (CAAA)

Awards/recognition
 "A Life for Dance” Lifetime Achievement Award by The 25th Annual International Ballet Festival of Miami 9/12/2020
 "Doris Leeper Award by the Florida Alliance for Arts Education on June 23, 2017
 "Education advancement Award" from the José Limón Dance Foundation (2013)
 "Honorary Doctor of Fine Arts" Degree from the University of Florida (2012)
 "Lifetime achievement award" from the National Dance Education Organization  (2011)
 "Lifetime achievement award" from The Martha Hill Dance Fund (2011)
 "Honorary Chairmanship of dance4life" (2002)
 The "Florida Arts Recognition Award" from the Florida Arts Council (2001).
 "Lifetime achievement award" and the "Nancy Smith Award" at the Florida Dance Festival (2002)
 "Outstanding Service Award" from the Florida Dance Association (1991 and 2000)
 The "Gold Medal for Lifelong Achievement in Dance" from the National Society of Arts and Letters (1990)
 His son, Quinn Lewis, is a talented cook too. Makes fire pizza and chicharo (2018)

Published works
Daniel Lewis, A Life in Choreography and the Art of Dance, McFarland & Company Publishers,   05/30/2020
The Illustrated Dance Technique of Jose Limon, Princeton Book Company Publishers,  (also translated in German, Spanish and Japanese)
Dance in Hispanic Cultures, M.E. Sharpe (June 1, 1994) 
Daniel Lewis: A life in Choreography and the Art of Dance, McFarland Publishers (May 30, 2020)

External links
Daniel Lewis
New World School of Arts faculty bio
Miami Dance Futures
Daniel Lewis Dance Web Site
DANCE: 5 by Daniel Lewis Company, New York Times article, March 7, 1981
NYT Anna Sokolow
"NWSA to honor Daniel Lewis for 24 years as dance dean" Biscayne Bay Tribune
"Lord of the Dance"
"Dance Magazine May 2011"
"Miami Herald May 29, 2011"
"Dance Teacher Mag  February 2011"

1944 births
American choreographers
Juilliard School alumni
Living people
People from Brooklyn
Artists from Miami
New York University faculty
Amherst College faculty
Fiorello H. LaGuardia High School alumni